The  was an anti-aircraft gun used by the Imperial Japanese Army during the Second Sino-Japanese War and World War II. The Type 88 number was designated for the year the gun was accepted, 2588 in the Japanese imperial year calendar, or 1928 in the Gregorian calendar. It replaced the earlier Type 11 75 mm AA gun in front line combat service, and at the time was equal in performances to any of its contemporaries in western armies and was considered capable of handling any targets the Japanese army was likely to encounter on the Asian mainland. Although it was soon overtaken by improvements in aircraft technology and was largely obsolete by 1941, it continued to be used on many fronts until the end of the war.

History and development

The Type 88 75 mm AA gun was based on an exhaustive evaluation by the Army Technical Bureau of several existing overseas designs, amalgamating some of the best features from each design (especially from the World War I-vintage British Vickers QF 3 inch 20 cwt AA gun) into a new, Japanese design. The Type 88's number was designated for the year the gun was accepted, 2588 in the Japanese imperial year calendar, or 1928 in the Gregorian calendar. The Type 88 was superior to Type 11 in accuracy and range of fire.

The Type 88 75 mm AA gun entered service between 1927 and 1928, and was deployed to virtually every anti-aircraft field artillery unit as protection against medium level aircraft attacks. Although it was difficult and expensive weapon for Japan to produce with its limited industrial infrastructure and production technology, it was produced in larger numbers than any other medium anti-aircraft weapon in the Japanese inventory. Over 2000 units completed by the time of the surrender of Japan.

In the early phases of World War II, Allied military intelligence initially assumed that the Japanese Type 88 was a copy of the formidable German Flak 36/37 88 mm gun due to its name. However, there is no connection between the two weapons. The confusion arose from the Japanese Army's nomenclature system. “Type 88” corresponds to the year 2588 in the Japanese imperial year, and not to the caliber of the weapon.

Design
The Type 88 75 mm AA gun had a single piece gun barrel with sliding breech, mounted on a central pedestal. The firing platform was supported by five legs, each of which (along with the central pedestal) had adjustable screwed foot for leveling. For transport each of the legs could be folded, and the barrel was also partially retractable.

Combat record

Tactically employed in battle as a four-gun field battery, Japanese combat forces used the weapon during the invasion of Manchuria, Soviet-Japanese Border Wars and the Second Sino-Japanese War. They found the Type 88 gun's high velocity rounds were extremely effective anti-tank weapon when fired horizontally. The weapon was the standard Japanese mobile antiaircraft artillery weapon and used against Allied forces more than any other artillery weapon.

During both the Battle of Iwo Jima and the Battle of Okinawa it was used effectively with armor-piercing rounds against American M4 Sherman tanks and as a coastal-defense gun. Against armor, it had the advantage of a 360 degree  traverse, but it was not easily moved and so it was less effective when fired from ambush against tanks.

Towards the end of the war many of the Type 88s were withdrawn from front line combat service and sent back to the home islands, to help reinforce  Japan's homeland defenses against Allied air raids and to prepare for the threat of Allied invasion. Some guns were also assigned to coastal defense batteries.

A variant was experimentally fitted to a Ki-109 bomber in an attempt to shoot down the B-29 Superfortress bombers at high altitude.

Weapons of comparable role, performance and era
 British QF 3 inch 20 cwt
 United States 3-inch M1918 gun

Ammunition
 Anti-aircraft
 Type 90 HE AA pointed:  complete round: 8.94 kg, projectile: 6.52 kg with Type 89 AA fuse
 High explosive
 Type 90 HE pointed: complete round: 8.55 kg, projectile: 6.35 with Type 88 impact or Type 88 delay
 Armor-piercing
 Type 95 APHE: complete round: 6.2 kg
 Shrapnel
 Smoke
 Incendiary
 Illumination

See also
Type 96 AA gun prime mover

Notes

References
 Bishop, Chris (eds) The Encyclopedia of Weapons of World War II. Barnes & Nobel. 1998. .
 Chant, Chris. Artillery of World War II, Zenith Press, 2001, .
 McLean, Donald B. Japanese Artillery; Weapons and Tactics. Wickenburg, Ariz.: Normount Technical Publications 1973. .
 Mayer, S.L. The Rise and Fall of Imperial Japan. The Military Press, 1984. 
 War Department Special Series No 25 Japanese Field Artillery October 1944
 U.S. Department of War, TM 30-480, Handbook on Japanese Military Forces, Louisiana State University Press, 1994. .
 War Department TM-E-30-480 Handbook on Japanese Military Forces September 1944

External links

Taki's Imperial Japanese Army

Artillery of Japan
World War II anti-aircraft guns
8
8
75 mm artillery
Military equipment introduced in the 1920s